Marquis Weeks (born October 2, 1980) is a former American football running back. He was originally signed by the Seattle Seahawks as an undrafted free agent in 2005. He played college football at Virginia

Marquis lettered in high school football and track at Conestoga High School, located in Berwyn, PA.

In the summer of 2014, Weeks was hired to teach as a 5th grade social studies teacher in the Tredyffrin-Easttown School District, the same school district in which he attended high school, Conestoga and went to school at Tredyffrin Easttown Middle School. In 2016, Marquis was hired as the head football coach at Conestoga High School his alma mater.

References

External links

1980 births
Living people
People from Fort Ord, California
American football running backs
Virginia Cavaliers football players
Seattle Seahawks players
Denver Broncos players
Players of American football from California